The Western Ukrainian Amateur Hockey League (ZUHL) (Zakhidno Ukrayinska amatorska khokeina liha) is an ice hockey league in Ukraine. Following the XVIII Ukrainian Championship in 2010, Division C (formerly the Western Division) was removed from the national championships. With the transfer of the Championship to the Professional Hockey League (PHL) in 2011, these teams became incorporated into the ZUHL on a permanent basis.

Teams

External links
Season standings

Ice hockey leagues in Ukraine
Amateur ice hockey